Saint-Ambroix is the name or part of the name of several communes in France:

 Saint-Ambroix, in the Cher department
 Saint-Ambroix, in the Gard department